Mobolaji Iyabode Akiode (born May 12, 1982) is an American-born former Nigerian women's basketball player.

Early life
Born in New Jersey, her family relocated to Nigeria shortly thereafter. Akiode moved back to the United States when she was nine and was raised in Maplewood, New Jersey. She was bullied for her height, but excelled academically and athletically and led Columbia High School to the 1998 state championship before graduating in 1999. Akiode earned a scholarship to play college basketball at Fordham University. At Fordham, Akiode won all-conference honors in her senior year and was the eighth Fordham player to record 1,000 points and 500 rebounds in her career. She also earned a tryout with the WNBA's Detroit Shock following her collegiate career.

Education
Akiode studied Accounting at Gabelli School of business, Fordham University, she graduated in 2004. She obtained her Masters of Business Administration from the New York University Stern School of Business in 2014.

College career
Akiode earned a scholarship to play college basketball at Fordham University. At Fordham, Akiode won all-conference honors in her senior year and was the eighth Fordham player to record 1,000 points and 500 rebounds in her career. She also earned a tryout with the WNBA's Detroit Shock following her collegiate career. She was inducted into the Fordhams University basketball Hall of fame in 2014.

Fordham statistics

Source

International career
Akiode was member of the Nigeria women's national basketball team at the 2004 Summer Olympics and 2006 Commonwealth Games. She graduated from Fordham with a degree in accounting. After graduation, she landed a job to work for ESPN. She moved back to Nigeria in 2010 to start a basketball camp. In 2014, she was named one of ESPNW's Impact 25.

Basketball camp

Akiode organizes an annual basketball camp called the Hope for Girls basketball camp which seeks to develop and mentor girls in the knowledge of basketball.
She has created opportunities for women to play basketball and study outside of Nigeria.

References

1982 births
Living people
Yoruba sportswomen
Basketball players at the 2004 Summer Olympics
Commonwealth Games competitors for Nigeria
Basketball players at the 2006 Commonwealth Games
Columbia High School (New Jersey) alumni
Fordham Rams women's basketball players
Nigerian women's basketball players
Nigerian expatriate basketball people in the United States
Olympic basketball players of Nigeria
American sportspeople of Nigerian descent
American people of Yoruba descent
Basketball players from New Jersey
American emigrants to Nigeria
New York University Stern School of Business alumni
People from Maplewood, New Jersey
Sportspeople from Essex County, New Jersey